The Joyce Mason School of Dance is an independent dance school based on Ashby High Street in Scunthorpe, North Lincolnshire, England.

Curriculum
The school specialises in the teaching of Theatre Dance, including Classical Ballet, Tap, and Modern Jazz and, has teachers qualified with leading dance organisations including the Royal Academy of Dance, International Dance Teachers Association, Imperial Society of Teachers of Dancing and British Association of Teachers of Dance.

The school is noted for having a number of students continue their training at a professional level, later working as professional dancers and theatre performers.  Former students of the school have also studied at the Royal Ballet School, Central School of Ballet, Bird College, Laine Theatre Arts, London Studio Centre, National Youth Ballet and National Youth Music Theatre.

Notable alumni

 Ross McLaren (born 1991) studied at the Joyce Mason School of Dance. He has since gone on to star in various musical theatre productions and portrays the role of Luca McIntyre in the BBC soap opera Doctors.
 Sheridan Smith (born 1981) studied at the school and has since appeared in a number of television programmes on British television and in theatre.

References

External links
Joyce Mason School of Dance

Dance schools in the United Kingdom
Education in the Borough of North Lincolnshire